Alfred Smoczyk Stadium is a stadium in Leszno, Poland. It is currently used for speedway matches and is the home stadium of Unia Leszno.  The stadium has a capacity of 15,000 people.

The stadium is located on ulica Strzelecka 7.

Alfred Smoczyk 
Alfred Smoczyk (1928–1950) was the first Polish speedway superstar. He successfully competed on Dutch tracks in the late 1940s, but died in a road accident in October 1950. He was a first Individual Polish Champion after World War II (in 1949).

Alfred Smoczyk Memorial 
The track currently hosts the annual Alfred Smoczyk Memorial, held each year since 1951. Former winners include Henryk Zyto, Jan Mucha, Zenon Plech, Roman Jankowski, Jan Krzystyniak, Greg Hancock, Tomasz Gollob, Leigh Adams and Ryan Sullivan. The 2014 Memorial winner was Polish rider Piotr Świderski.

Track
The track record was made by Janusz Kołodziej (58.12 sec on 9 May 2010).

Records

See also
 Motorcycle speedway

References

 

Speedway venues in Poland
Buildings and structures in Greater Poland Voivodeship
Leszno
Sports venues in Greater Poland Voivodeship